The 1910 Olivet football team represented Olivet College during the 1910 college football season.

Schedule

References

Olivet
Olivet Comets football seasons
Olivet football